Jozef Bujňák (born 27 January 1994) is a Slovak football defender who currently plays for 2. liga club ŠK Odeva Lipany.

Club career

1. FC Tatran Prešov
Bujňák made his professional Fortuna Liga debut for 1. FC Tatran Prešov against MFK Ružomberok on 16 July 2016.

References

External links
 1. FC Tatran Prešov official club profile
 Fortuna Liga profile
 
 Eurofotbal profile
 Futbalnet profile

1994 births
Living people
Slovak footballers
Association football defenders
1. FC Tatran Prešov players
ŠK Odeva Lipany players
Slovak Super Liga players
Expatriate soccer players in the United States
Slovak expatriate sportspeople in the United States
2. Liga (Slovakia) players
Slovak expatriate footballers